Jacob Lagacé (born January 9, 1990) is a Canadian professional ice hockey forward who is currently playing for ESV Kaufbeuren of the DEL2 (GER).

Playing career
He was selected by the Buffalo Sabres in the 5th round (134th overall) of the 2008 NHL Entry Draft. Whilst under contract to Buffalo he previously played in the American Hockey League for Sabres affiliates, the Portland Pirates and the Rochester Americans.

In the 2018–19 season, Lagacé played with the Stavanger Oilers of the Norwegian GET-ligaen. Posting 25 goals and 50 points in 46 games, Lagace continued to produce in the post-season with 7 points in 9 games. 

At the conclusion of the season, Lagacé left as a free agent continuing his European career by signing a one-year contract with German outfit, Krefeld Pinguine of the DEL on April 5, 2019.
Since the 22/23 season he has a contract with the DEL2 team ESV Kaufbeuren.

Career statistics

Regular season and playoffs

International

Awards and honours

References

External links

1990 births
Living people
Asplöven HC players
Bakersfield Condors (1998–2015) players
Buffalo Sabres draft picks
Cape Breton Screaming Eagles players
Chicoutimi Saguenéens (QMJHL) players
Dragons de Rouen players
Greenville Road Warriors players
Krefeld Pinguine players
Luleå HF players
Mora IK players
Orlando Solar Bears (ECHL) players
Portland Pirates players
Rochester Americans players
Stavanger Oilers players
Tønsberg Vikings players
Wheeling Nailers players
Canadian ice hockey forwards
Ice hockey people from Quebec
Canadian expatriate ice hockey players in Norway
Canadian expatriate ice hockey players in Sweden